The men's tournament of volleyball at the 2013 Bolivarian Games in Trujillo, Peru was held between November 17 and November 21 at the Coliseo Gran Chimu.

This edition of the tournament, was the first with 6 teams instead of the usual 4. The defending champions were Venezuela. Chile won the gold medal for the first time.

Teams

Round-Robyn
This edition of the tournament will feature a sole Round-Robyn round with the top team being declared the champion. Matches were not seeded, instead the order of the matches were decided in a Draw at the technical meeting.

|}

Match Results

|}

Final standings

Medalists

References

Events at the 2013 Bolivarian Games
2013 in volleyball
Volleyball at the Bolivarian Games